Chanchamayo Fútbol Club is a Peruvian football club, playing in the city of Chanchamayo, Junín, Peru.

History
The club was founded as Club Social Deportivo Hostal Rey and played in the Primera Division Peruana in 1984 until 1985.

In 1985, the club changed his name to Chanchamayo FC.

See also
List of football clubs in Peru
Peruvian football league system

External links
Marca Fútbol: El Rey de los Hostales

Football clubs in Peru
Association football clubs established in 2002